Grusonia grahamii is a species of plant in the family Cactaceae.

It is endemic to Texas and New Mexico in the United States and Chihuahua and Durango in Mexico.

References

grahamii